In mathematics, subharmonic and superharmonic functions are important classes of functions used extensively in partial differential equations, complex analysis and potential theory.

Intuitively, subharmonic functions are related to convex functions of one variable as follows. If the graph of a convex function and a line intersect at two points, then the graph of the convex function is below the line between those points. In the same way, if the values of a subharmonic function are no larger than the values of a harmonic function on the boundary of a ball, then the values of the subharmonic function are no larger than the values of the harmonic function also inside the ball.

Superharmonic functions can be defined by the same description, only replacing "no larger" with "no smaller". Alternatively, a superharmonic function is just the negative of a subharmonic function, and for this reason any property of subharmonic functions can be easily transferred to superharmonic functions.

Formal definition
Formally, the definition can be stated as follows. Let  be a subset of the Euclidean space  and let

be an upper semi-continuous function.

Note that by the above, the function which is identically −∞ is subharmonic, but some authors exclude this function by definition.

A function  is called superharmonic if  is subharmonic.

Properties
 A function is harmonic if and only if it is both subharmonic and superharmonic. 
 The maximum of a subharmonic function cannot be achieved in the interior of its domain unless the function is constant, this is the so-called maximum principle. However, the minimum of a subharmonic function can be achieved in the interior of its domain.
 Subharmonic functions make a convex cone, that is, a linear combination of subharmonic functions with positive coefficients is also subharmonic.
The pointwise maximum of two subharmonic functions is subharmonic. If the pointwise maximum of a countable number of subharmonic functions is upper semi-continuous, then it is also subharmonic. 
The limit of a decreasing sequence of subharmonic functions is subharmonic (or identically equal to ).
Subharmonic functions are not necessarily continuous in the usual topology, however one can introduce the fine topology which makes them continuous.

Examples
If  is analytic then  is subharmonic. More examples can be constructed by using the properties listed above,
by taking maxima, convex combinations and limits. In dimension 1, all subharmonic functions can be obtained in this way.

Riesz Representation Theorem
If a harmonic majorant exists, then there exists the least harmonic majorant, and

while in dimension 2,

This is called the Riesz representation theorem.

Subharmonic functions in the complex plane
Subharmonic functions are of a particular importance in complex analysis, where they are intimately connected to holomorphic functions.

One can show that a real-valued, continuous function  of a complex variable (that is, of two real variables) defined on a set  is subharmonic if and only if for any closed disc  of center  and radius  one has

Intuitively, this means that a subharmonic function is at any point no greater than the average of the values in a circle around that point, a fact which can be used to derive the maximum principle.

If  is a holomorphic function, then 
 
It follows that
 
is subharmonic for every α > 0. This observation plays a role in the theory of Hardy spaces, especially for the study of H when 0 < p < 1.

In the context of the complex plane, the connection to the convex functions can be realized as well by the fact that a subharmonic function  on a domain  that is constant in the imaginary direction is convex in the real direction and vice versa.

Harmonic majorants of subharmonic functions

Subharmonic functions in the unit disc. Radial maximal function 
Let φ be subharmonic, continuous and non-negative in an open subset Ω of the complex plane containing the closed unit disc D(0, 1). The radial maximal function for the function φ (restricted to the unit disc) is defined on the unit circle by

If Pr denotes the Poisson kernel, it follows from the subharmonicity that

It can be shown that the last integral is less than the value at e of the Hardy–Littlewood maximal function φ∗ of the restriction of φ to the unit circle T,

so that 0 ≤ M φ ≤ φ∗. It is known that the Hardy–Littlewood operator is bounded on Lp(T) when 1 < p < ∞.
It follows that for some universal constant C,

If f is a function holomorphic in Ω and 0 < p < ∞, then the preceding inequality applies to φ = |f|. It can be deduced from these facts that any function F in the classical Hardy space Hp satisfies

With more work, it can be shown that F has radial limits F(e) almost everywhere on the unit circle, and (by the dominated convergence theorem) that Fr, defined by Fr(e) = F(re) tends to F in Lp(T).

Subharmonic functions on Riemannian manifolds 
Subharmonic functions can be defined on an arbitrary Riemannian manifold.

Definition: Let M be a Riemannian manifold, and  an upper semicontinuous function. Assume that for any open subset , and any harmonic function f1 on U, such that  on the boundary of U, the inequality  holds on all U. Then f is called subharmonic.

This definition is equivalent to one given above. Also, for twice differentiable functions, subharmonicity is equivalent to the inequality , where  is the usual Laplacian.

See also
 Plurisubharmonic function — generalization to several complex variables
 Classical fine topology

Notes

References 
 
 

 
Potential theory
Complex analysis
Types of functions